Anguran Rural District is in Anguran District of Mahneshan County, Zanjan province, Iran. At the National Census of 2006, its population was 9,457 in 2,101 households. There were 8,331 inhabitants in 2,513 households at the following census of 2011. At the most recent census of 2016, the population of the rural district was 7,890 in 2,463 households. The largest of its 54 villages was Anguran, with 1,282 people.

References 

Mahneshan County

Rural Districts of Zanjan Province

Populated places in Zanjan Province

Populated places in Mahneshan County